The Hyrynsalmi – Kuusamo railway line was built by the  German Wehrmacht in the middle of Finland near the  Soviet border.

History 
After Hyrynsalmi got a railway connection in 1939, the Wehrmacht tried to reach the city of Kuusamo 178 km away during  World War II. A Heeresfeldbahn was built in the  gauge of 750 mm. Operations started on September 3, 1942. Just two years later, with the advance of the  Soviet Army, operations had to be closed again. In 1948 the tracks were dismantled.

In the years 1956–1961 a railway line in Russian broad gauge was built between Hyrynsalmi and Taivalkoski, which mostly shared the old route as far as Korvua. This railway line has only been partially in operation since 2004 (up to Trennungsbahnhof Pesiökylä).

Gallery

Literature 
 Lars Westerlund:  Saksan vankileirit Suomessa ja raja-alueilla 1941-1944 , Helsinki: Tammi, 2008, ISBN 978-951314277-3.
 DVD "Kuolemanrata". A film by Timo Koivisto, Nimbus-Filmi, 1999.

External links 

 Info at www.taivalkoski.fi (Finnish)

Railway lines in Finland
Military railways
750 mm gauge railways